The mogho naba of Wogodogo is the ruler ("king of the world") of Wogodogo, one of the Mossi Kingdoms located in present-day Burkina Faso. The kingdom takes its name from its historic capital, now the Burkinabe national capital of Ouagadougou. Although the most politically powerful of the Mossi Kingdoms, there was no Mossi "empire", and the Wogodogo king did not have authority over the other kingdoms. The French colonial period and subsequent independence have reduced the power vested in the position, but the mogho naba retains an influential role in Burkina Faso.

The position is typically hereditary, following male-only lines of descent. Originally, the position passed primarily to brothers (or even cousins), rather than to sons, but by the reign of Zombré had transitioned to its current order of succession, where rule generally passes to the eldest living son of the previous ruler. Children born to sons who predecease their fathers are not eligible to inherit the title. However, a tribal council is ultimately responsible for selecting the mogho naba, and the heir apparent may be passed over if, for example, he is deemed physically unfit for the position's traditional role in war or if he would fail to uphold the dignity of the office (as in cases of adultery). This council has traditionally included: the baloum naba, head of the king's servants; the gounga naba, leader of the infantry; the larale naba, keeper of the royal tombs; the kamsaogo naba, manager of the palace eunuchs; and the widi naba, the royal groom.

Rulers of Wogodogo 
The chronology of the Mossi Kingdoms prior to the French occupation is unclear. Historian Yamba Tiendrebeogo reconstructed the history of Wogodogo from Mossi oral tradition that included the lengths of the reigns of historical rulers. Other scholars propose more recent dates for many pre-colonial events—setting the start of Oubri's reign around 1495 rather than 1182—and correspondingly shorter reigns for many rulers.

As mogho naba of Tenkodogo 

The first Mossi Kingdom was centered around Tenkodogo. Wogodogo, initially a client state of Tenkodogo, gradually grew in power until it was the dominant political power in the Mossi Kingdoms; nevertheless, the rulers of Tenkodogo prior to the formation of Wogodogo are counted as kings of Wogodogo by tradition.

As mogho naba of Oubritenga 
The first capital of Oubritenga ("Oubri's land") was Guilongou, near modern-day Ziniaré, but typically moved to a village preferred by each new king upon his accession.

As mogho naba of Wogodogo 
Naba Zombré relocated the capital to Wogodogo (Ouagadougou).

Scope of power 
According to Titinga Frédéric Pacéré, in tradition, he is considered all powerful with right of life and death on the inhabitants of Wogodogo and Oubritenga. In practice, his power was subject to the custom and law of the fathers. He personifies the empire and embodies its unity, but power is really in the hands of the court of the mogho naba, ministers who make decisions and govern the country. This complex organisation of powers is materialised every Friday during the ceremony of the false departure of the king.

The mogho naba has no authority over the other kingdoms of Tenkodogo, Fada N'Gourma, Boussouma and Ouahigouya, whose sovereigns would be, like him, descendants of Yennenga. Traditionally, the rulers of these four kingdoms and the mogho naba avoid each other, but they happen to meet, such as happened in 1946 to consult on the reconstruction of the Upper Volta.

Notes

References

Bibliography 
 
 
 
 

Burkina Faso-related lists
French West Africa
Lists of African rulers